Church Island may refer to:
Church Island (Menai Strait), Wales
Church Island, River Thames, England
Church Island (Lough Gill), Ireland
Church Island (Lough Currane), Ireland
Church Island (Valentia Harbour), Ireland
Church Island (Lough Owel), Ireland